Ole Bjerke (13 April 1881 – 15 April 1959) was a Norwegian sport shooter. He was born in Åsnes, and his club was Hof Skytterlag. He competed in the military rifle shooting at the 1912 Summer Olympics in Stockholm.

References

1881 births
1959 deaths
People from Åsnes
Shooters at the 1912 Summer Olympics
Olympic shooters of Norway
Norwegian male sport shooters
Sportspeople from Innlandet
20th-century Norwegian people